The South Brooksville Avenue Historic District is a U.S. Historic District (designated as such on September 25, 1998) located in Brooksville, Florida. The district is on South Brooksville Avenue, from Liberty Street to Early Avenue. It contains 17 historic buildings.

Historic homes on South Brooksville Avenue include:

 Coogler House at 133 S Brooksville Avenue
 Frazee House at 302 S Brooksville Avenue
 Maillis House at 312 South Brooksville Avenue

Gallery

References

Geography of Hernando County, Florida
Historic districts on the National Register of Historic Places in Florida
National Register of Historic Places in Hernando County, Florida